Melânia Luz (1 June 1928 – 22 June 2016) was a Brazilian sprinter. She competed in the women's 200 metres at the 1948 Summer Olympics.

References

External links
 

1928 births
2016 deaths
Athletes (track and field) at the 1948 Summer Olympics
Brazilian female sprinters
Olympic athletes of Brazil
Place of birth missing
Olympic female sprinters